Benjamin Sullivan may refer to:

 Ben Sullivan, a character in the TV series Scrubs
 Benjamin Sullivan (artist) (born 1977), British visual artist

Ben Sullivan (actor), Canadian actor based in Vancouver.

Ben Mitchell (EastEnders), a fictional character in the soap opera EastEnders